Nuri Bilge Ceylan (born 26 January 1959) is a Turkish photographer, filmmaker and actor best known for the Palme d'Or winning Winter Sleep (2014).

Early life
Ceylan was born in Istanbul on 26 January 1959. His interest in photography started at the age of 15. While studying at Boğaziçi University he participated in cinema and photography clubs and he took passport-style photos to make some money. After graduating from university with a bachelor of science degree in electrical engineering, he went to London and Kathmandu, Nepal, to decide what to do in life. Then he went back to Ankara, Turkey, to do military service. When he was in the army, he discovered that cinema would give shape to his life.

Style and themes
Ceylan's films deal with the estrangement of the individual, existentialism, the monotony of human lives, and the details of everyday life. He uses static shots and long takes, usually in natural settings, as well as play with sound, including the use of menacing silences.  He is known for filming his protagonist from behind, which, in his view, leaves the audiences to speculate on the brooding emotions of characters whose faces are obscured. Ceylan's first films were made on low budgets, with casts generally consisting of amateur actors, most of whom were his family and neighbours.

Personal life
He is married to filmmaker, photographer, and actress Ebru Ceylan, with whom he co-starred in Climates (2006). He directed his cousin Mehmet Emin Toprak in three films.

Ceylan named his ten favorite films in the "2012 Sight & Sound Greatest Films Poll": Andrei Rublev (1966), Au Hasard Balthazar (1966), L'Avventura (1960), L'Eclisse (1962), Late Spring (1949), A Man Escaped (1956), The Mirror (1975), Scenes from a Marriage (1973), Shame (1968), and Tokyo Story (1953).

Filmography

Accolades
Palme d'Or (2014 - "Winter Sleep")
Cannes Film Festival Best Director Award (2008 - Three Monkeys)
Grand Jury Prize / Grand Prix at Cannes Film Festival (2002 – Uzak ("Distant"), 2011 – Once Upon a Time in Anatolia)
FIPRESCI Award (1997 – Kasaba ("Small Town" or "The Town"), 2000 – Clouds of May, 2006 – Iklimler ("Climates")), 2014 – Winter Sleep
Golden Orange Award for Best Director (1999 – Clouds of May, 2002 – Uzak (Distant), 2006 – Iklimler ("Climates"))
Golden Orange Award for Best Screenplay (2002 – Uzak ("Distant"))
Asia Pacific Screen Award for Best Director (2008 – Üç Maymun ("Three Monkeys"), 2011 – Once Upon a Time in Anatolia, 2014 – Winter Sleep

References

External links
Official web site

Nuri Bilge Ceylan at altcine

1959 births
Best Director Golden Orange Award winners
Best Screenplay Golden Orange Award winners
European Film Awards winners (people)
Boğaziçi University alumni
Cannes Film Festival Award for Best Director winners
Directors of Palme d'Or winners
Living people
Mimar Sinan Fine Arts University alumni
Film people from Istanbul
Turkish film directors
Turkish people of Circassian descent
Photographers from Istanbul
Turkish contemporary artists
Turkish male screenwriters
Asia Pacific Screen Award winners